Agkistrodon monticola is a taxonomic synonym that may refer to:

 Ovophis monticola, a.k.a. the mountain pitviper, a venomous pitviper species found in Asia
 Gloydius monticola, a.k.a. the Likiang pitviper, a venomous pitviper found in southern China